Dembe may refer to:
 Dembe (sport): a form of traditional Hausa boxing
 Dembe (DRC), a town in the Kivu region of the Democratic Republic of the Congo
 Dembe (Poland), a town in Poland
 Dembe (Eritrea), a town in Eritrea
 Dembe, Huambo, a town in Provincia do Huambo, Angola
 Dembe, Bie, a town in Provincia do Bie, Angola
 Dembe (Uganda), a town in  Busoga Province, Uganda
 Dembe (Chad), a town in Prefecture du Ouaddai, Chad
 Dembe (Central African Republic), a town in the Central African Republic
 Dembe, Sulawesi, a town in Propinsi Sulawesi Utara, Indonesia